Sherlock Toms is a 2017 Indian Malayalam-language comedy film directed by Shafi and written by Sachy. The film stars Biju Menon, Miya, Srinda Arhaan, Salim Kumar, and Kalabhavan Shajohn. It was produced by Prem Menon under his Global United Media. The plot follows the encounters of Thomas, an Indian Revenue Service employee, who is fondly Sherlock Toms due to his shrewd intelligence and keen observation skills. The film was inspired by hollywood flick Man on a Ledge . The film was released on 29 September 2017.

Plot 
Young Thomas Joy is an avid fan of Sherlock Holmes, a character created by Arthur Conan Doyle. His friends call him 'Sherlock Toms' due to his keen observation skills. Despite some childhood difficulties he grows up to be an IRS officer but has a troubled relationship with his wife Rekha, whom he married accidentally.

Tom conducts an unfruitful raid on a "chit fund company" in which he caused damage to their vault and got suspended. Tom attributes it to his wife's behaviour and has an argument with her. She calls the police and alleges Tom hit her. He then faces court cases brought by Rekha and the chit fund company. When it becomes apparent his lawyer is not succeeding in proving his innocence, Tom loudly threatens to commit suicide. The judge orders Tom to undergo psychiatric treatment but during the commotion, he flees and accidentally enters a large hotel opposite to the office of the chit company from where he demands the lifting of his suspension and a divorce from Rekha. He and Rekha argue while he is still about to commit suicide and exposes his toxic relationship and abuse he suffered from her in front of hundreds and TV. He also asks for a rock band to play music while he stood there and demanded a reporter speak to him. 

In the hotel room, which he gatecrashes, he discovers cancelled currencies which he shows to the gathered media reporting about him. When the police rescue team captured him, Tom confesses his suicide threat was a distraction to get the company raided thereby clearing his name.

Cast

References

External links
 

2010s Malayalam-language films
Indian comedy films
Films shot in Kochi
Films scored by Rahul Raj
Films scored by Bijibal
Films directed by Shafi
2017 comedy films